Huntiglennia is a genus of jumping spiders found in New South Wales. Its single described species is Huntiglennia williamsi.

References 

  (2007): The world spider catalog, version 8.0. American Museum of Natural History.

Salticidae
Fauna of New South Wales
Monotypic Salticidae genera
Spiders of Australia